PA29 may refer to:
 Pennsylvania Route 29
 Pennsylvania's 29th congressional district
 Piper PA-29 Papoose